Susan Talamantes Eggman (born March 3, 1961) is an American politician who is currently serving in the California State Senate. A Democrat, she represents the 5th Senate District, which encompasses western San Joaquin County, since January 19, 2022 she has served as Assistant Majority Leader.

Prior to being elected to the Senate in 2020, she was a member of the California State Assembly representing the 13th Assembly District as well as being a Stockton City Councilwoman and Associate Professor of social work at California State University, Sacramento.

Eggman is openly lesbian and is a member and past chair of the California Legislative LGBT Caucus. She is also a member of the California Latino Legislative Caucus.

Biography
Susan C. Eggman was born 3 March 1961, in Alameda County, California, Talamantes is her mother's maiden name. Her brother Michael ran in the primary, for California's 10th congressional district, on June 5, 2018.

Eggman grew up in Stanislaus County and graduated from Turlock High School in 1979. After graduation, she enlisted in the U.S. Army, where she served four years from 1979 to 1983 as a medic at the Fort Meade army hospital, Maryland. After the military, she attended California State University, Stanislaus, where she earned both a bachelor's degree in psychology and a master of social work. She later earned a Ph.D. in social work from Portland State University.

Departure from state Assembly
On May 19, 2019, Eggman announced that she would be a candidate for the California state Senate in California's 5th State Senate district in 2020. Incumbent state Senator Cathleen Galgiani was not eligible for reelection due to term limits.

2012 California State Assembly

2014 California State Assembly

2016 California State Assembly

2018 California State Assembly

References

External links

Campaign website
Join California Susan Eggman

1961 births
Living people
California city council members
Female United States Army personnel
LGBT Hispanic and Latino American people
Lesbian politicians
LGBT state legislators in California
Hispanic and Latino American state legislators in California
Hispanic and Latino American women in politics
Democratic Party members of the California State Assembly
Women state legislators in California
California State University, Stanislaus alumni
Portland State University alumni
American politicians of Mexican descent
Women city councillors in California
People from Castro Valley, California
21st-century American politicians
21st-century American women politicians
United States Army soldiers